This is a complete list of episodes for the BBC Three supernatural drama-comedy television series Being Human.  The original premise of the series was that a ghost, a vampire, and a werewolf became friends and began living together in a house in Bristol.  All three characters appear to be in their 20s.  The programme's original cast included Lenora Crichlow as Annie the ghost, Russell Tovey as George the werewolf, and Aidan Turner as Mitchell the vampire.

For series 3, Sinead Keenan was promoted from a supporting to a main character as George's werewolf girlfriend, Nina, and the characters and the show's location moved to Barry, Vale of Glamorgan. Turner left the show at the end of series 3, and his character was killed off. On 11 November 2011, Russell Tovey announced that he was leaving Being Human during series 4 to work full-time on his other show, Him & Her, and he appeared in the first episode only. Keenan also did not return to the series. Damien Molony was introduced as vampire Hal, with Michael Socha's previously recurring role as werewolf Tom promoted to the main cast. Series 4 also introduced Kate Bracken as Alex, who soon becomes a ghost and takes Annie's place in the household at the conclusion of the series when the latter passes over into the afterlife.

Originally, the pilot episode and all episodes of Series 1 and 2 were untitled. Semi-official names have since been provided via a competition run by series creator Toby Whithouse via his blog.

Summary

Episodes

Pilot (2008)

Series 1 (2009)
The series deals with a supernatural threat, Herrick, a Vampire Leader. The cast and tone of Being Human changed between the pilot and the series. Compared to the pilot, producer Matthew Bouch described the series as "less gothic and slightly more rooted" as well as "a bit funnier"; he also described the series as "kind of a reboot" of the pilot. Writer Toby Whithouse, however, said that he does consider the pilot to be canonical.

Interior shots of Mitchell, Annie, and George's home, the hospital, and the vampires' funeral home headquarters were filmed on sound stages with exterior shots filmed on location. The funeral parlour's exterior and reception room were filmed in an old car showroom in Bristol, while the back rooms were filmed in a television studio.

To promote the show, the BBC launched a blog, and on 22 December 2008, the BBC Being Human web page aired three prequel videos to introduce the three main characters: Mitchell's is set in the 1960s, George's is a video diary of his visit of Scotland, and Annie's shows her as a ghost terrorizing a couple who had moved into the house. Series one of Being Human premiered in the US on 25 July 2009 on BBC America and on 4 August on Fox in Portugal.

Metacritic assigned a rating of 79 out of 100 based on 8 critical reviews, with reviews averaging 7.8 out of 10.

Series 2 (2010)
Series two began filming in August 2009, and began airing in the UK on 10 January 2010. It was expanded to eight episodes, with series creator Toby Whithouse writing the first two and last two episodes. The cold open sequences followed a new pattern: from episode two onwards each one depicts something from the history of either the main cast or other characters. A prequel posted on the BBC website introduced two new vampire characters: Ivan and Daisy.  BBC America began transmitting Series 2 on 24 July 2010.

This series was concerned with a human threat, CenSAA.

Series 3 (2011)
Series 3 premiered in the United Kingdom on 23 January 2011, and contained eight episodes. The show was now set in Barry, Wales, with the characters having moved from Bristol following the "Box Tunnel" murders (committed by main character John Mitchell). Lacey Turner played the recurring character Lia, a ghost encountered by Mitchell when he travelled to "the other side" in an attempt to rescue Annie from purgatory.

Robson Green and Michael Socha play two father and son recurring werewolf characters MacNair (given name Anthony not used until his final episode) and Thomas MacNair. Both he and his teenage son are vampire killers. The series also reveals that zombies also exist in the Being Human universe and one appears in the third episode. BBC America began transmitting Series 3 on 18 February 2011.

Series 3 story arcs included a prophecy that Mitchell would die from a "wolf-shaped bullet" (killed by a werewolf), Nina's pregnancy, and the resurrection of the cruel, manipulative vampire, Herrick.

Series 4 (2012)
On 13 March 2011, Whithouse and BBC Three announced that Being Human would return for a fourth series. Eight 60-minute episodes were commissioned.

The producer also said some old characters would return, and he intended to introduce new ones. Radio Times reported that the fourth series is likely to air in early 2012, and that the characters will continue to live on Barry Island. On 19 April 2011, BBC America announced it would co-produce the fourth series with BBC Three.

On 30 April 2011, actor Michael Socha, who plays the innocent young werewolf Tom, told the Derby Telegraph that he'd been asked by Toby Whithouse to appear in Series Four. On 26 May, actor Craig Roberts told British magazine SFX that his character will return to the show.  Roberts, who plays the eternally teenaged vampire Adam, said, "I believe I am going back for an episode. They've not mentioned too much about Becoming Human. If that does get mentioned again I'm all for doing it because I thought it was a great thing. I'm really happy to do Being Human again because it's a fantastic show, and if Becoming Human wants to go again, I'm game." On 22 July, the Warrington Guardian reported that 22-year-old Andrew Gower had been cast as Cutler, a vampire who will become one of the main characters on the show. South Wales actor Darren Evans appeared on the show as a vampire, reprising his role later on in series five.

On 16 October 2011, SFX magazine revealed that Irish actor and 2011 Spotlight Prize nominee Damien Molony (a recent graduate of the Drama Centre London) had been cast as the new vampire Hal. Molony told the magazine in an interview that Hal is an upper-class, very English, well-dressed vampire for which the writers have laid out an extensive back-story. Molony also revealed that his character will fall in love. Series creator Toby Whithouse told the online version of magazine Digital Spy that the series would "have to re-establish...relatively soon in series four" the main concept of a vampire, werewolf, and ghost living in a home together, but declined to comment further on what the details of this might be. In an interview with the Web site CultBox, series star Russell Tovey said that Hal would be "the new head vampire."

Series star Russell Tovey denied rumors that his werewolf character George Sands might not appear in the entire series. In his CultBox interview, Tovey said that the plot lines were "very spread out", that "a lot more happens", and that a number of new main and recurring characters had been added to Series Four. "[T]he storyline is going completely crazy,..." he said. Dave Golder, writing for SFX magazine, concluded that Tovey's comments meant fans would see less of George and more of the new characters, and that Whithouse would be likely to reinvent the show with all these changes.

The filmmakers returned to Barry Island to film season four in late July 2011, where they continued to use local man Gary Rowe's house as the group's bed-and-breakfast base of operations. Students from the drama and theatre programme at Coleg Gwent were used as extras and in minor roles on the show. Cast member Damien Molony said in mid-October 2011 that several scenes for the series' final episodes had already been filmed.

On 11 November 2011, Russell Tovey announced he was leaving the show after Series 4.

The March 2012 issue of SFX magazine revealed the episode titles for series four as part of a preview feature.

Series 5 (2013)

Following the broadcast of the series four finale the BBC confirmed that a fifth series had been commissioned. Michael Socha and Damien Molony reprised their roles as Tom and Hal, and Kate Bracken joined the main cast as Alex. The series started 3 February 2013 with "The Trinity".

Making-of special (2009)
The Making-of is called Being Human Unearthed. It was broadcast on 28 March 2009 on BBC Three In the United States it was shown at 26 July 2009 on BBC America. The Being Human fans in Australia could see Being Human Unearthed at 11 June 2010 on ABC 2.

References

External links

 NA
Being Human
Being Human
Being Human
Being Human